In urology, the Mitrofanoff principle is the creation of a passageway for urine or enema fluid that, by its (surgical) construction, has a valve mechanism to allow continence.

Procedures which make use of the Mitrofanoff principle:
Mitrofanoff procedure
Malone antegrade continence enema
Monti procedure

Eponym
It is named after the French urologist (Mitrofanoff) who popularized it.

References

External links
Mitrofanoff principle - biology-online.com.
Mitrofanoff principle - cancerweb.ncl.ac.uk.

Urology